Grevillea raybrownii is a flowering shrub in the family Proteaceae and is endemic to New South Wales. It has divided, pointed leaves and dense clusters of  flowers usually at the end of branches.

Description
The leaf upper surface is smooth and the underside has two grooves. The perianth is white with a brownish limb, the inside is smooth and the outside covered in flattened dense silky hairs.

Taxonomy and naming
Grevillea raybrownii was first formally described in 1994 by Peter Olde and Neil Marriott and the description was published in Telopea.The specific epithet (raybrownii) is in honour of Ray Brown, for his contribution to the horticulture of Grevillea.

Distribution and habitat
This species has a restricted distribution, it grows in sandy, gravelly loams in dry sclerophyll forest, mostly on ridge tops, occasionally on slopes, between Dapto, Robertson and Berrima in New South Wales.

Conservation status
Grevillea raybrownii is listed as a "vulnerable species" under the New South Wales Government ''Biodiversity Conservation Act 2016.

References

raybrownii
Proteales of Australia
Flora of New South Wales
Plants described in 1994